"Aura Lea" (sometimes spelled "Aura Lee") is an American Civil War song about a maiden. It was written by W. W. Fosdick (lyrics) and George R. Poulton (music). The melody was used in Elvis Presley's 1956 hit song "Love Me Tender".

History

Aura Lea was published by Poulton, an Englishman who had come to America with his family as a boy in 1838, and Fosdick in 1861. It was a sentimental ballad at a time when upbeat and cheerful songs were more popular in the music halls. It became popular as a minstrel song, and the tune was also taken up by the U.S. Military Academy as a graduating class song, called "Army Blue"; new lyrics by L. W. Becklaw were sung to the original melody.

The Civil War began shortly after the song's release, "Aura Lea" was adopted by soldiers on both sides, and was often sung around campfires.

The tune is familiar to modern audiences from the 1956 Elvis Presley #1 hit "Love Me Tender"  with new lyrics by Ken Darby, a derivative adaptation of the original. A later Presley recording for the film The Trouble with Girls entitled "Violet (Flower of N.Y.U.)" also used the melody of "Aura Lea".

Lyrics
The lyrics as written by Fosdick:
When the blackbird in the Spring,
Neath the willow tree,
Sat and rocked', I heard him sing,
Sing of Aura Lea.
Aura Lea, Aura Lea,
Maid of golden hair;
Sunshine came along with thee,
And swallows in the air.
Chorus:
Aura Lea, Aura Lea,
Maid of golden hair;
Sunshine came along with thee,
And swallows in the air.

In thy blush the rose was born,
Music, when you spake,
Through thine azure eye the morn,
Sparkling seemed to break.
Aura Lea, Aura Lea,
Birds of crimson wing,
Never song have sung to me,
As in that sweet spring.
(Chorus)

Aura Lea! the bird may flee,
The willow's golden hair
Swing through winter fitfully,
On the stormy air.
Yet if thy blue eyes I see,
Gloom will soon depart;
For to me, sweet Aura Lea
Is sunshine through the heart.
(Chorus)

When the mistletoe was green,
Midst the winter's snows,
Sunshine in thy face was seen,
Kissing lips of rose.
Aura Lea, Aura Lea,
Take my golden ring;
Love and light return with thee,
And swallows with the spring.
(Chorus)

In popular culture
"Aura Lee" was sung by Frances Farmer and a male chorus in the 1936 film Come and Get It, based on Edna Ferber's novel.

Bing Crosby included the song in a medley on his album Join Bing and Sing Along  (1959)

Diana Muldaur sings the song to David Carradine in the episode "The Elixir" of Kung Fu.

Jerry Lanning performed the song in "Big Star", 
 1962 episode of The Donna Reed Show.

The television cavalry comedy F Troop used a variation of the song to welcome saloon singer Laura Lee in the episode "She's Only a Build in a Girdled Cage" (cf. "She's only a bird in a gilded cage").

The television western The Young Riders used the song in its series finale, which took place in 1861 and showed how the American Civil War was affecting its characters' lives.

It is the running theme music in the background of the 1954 John Ford film The Long Gray Line.

Allan Sherman topicalized the song in his "Shticks of One and a Half Dozen of the Other" (on the album My Son, The Celebrity, 1963 Warner Records Inc) with this polio-based version:
Every time you take vaccine, take it orally [a pun on "Aura Lea"]
As you know the other way is more painfully!

An episode of The Rockford Files is called "Aura Lee Farewell".  However the few lyrics that are recited are actually from the poem "Annabel Lee" by Edgar Allan Poe.

On the show Beverly Hills 90210 on the episode The Real McCoy (05/10/95), Dylan McKay Luke Perry was led into a past life in the wild wild west through hypnotic regression with his hypnotherapist. During his hypnosis session, he imagined that he walked into a saloon, where a hurdy gurdy girl was singing "Aura Lea."

The tune is used by the Cartoon Planet Band in the song "I Love Almost Everybody", which was also found on the associated album, Space Ghost's Musical Bar-B-Que.

Caitlín R. Kiernan's 2007 novel Daughter of Hounds has a character singing the winter verse of "Aura Lee"  during a snowstorm.

Oona Laurence sings the song in the Sofia Coppola film The Beguiled (2017).

The melody is also used in the Welsh hymn "Os Wyt Eisiau Bod yn Llon"

Parody
The 1983 film Trading Places includes Ivy League stockbrokers at their racquet club singing a sexualized parody of this song about their college days and their fraternity's conquest of various women on locations at campus, with the refrain changed to "Constance Frye." The television show How I Met Your Mother 2009 episode (season 5 episode 22) "Robots Versus Wrestlers" features Ted Mosby at an upper-class party singing the Trading Places "Constance Frye" version along with film director Peter Bogdanovich and The New York Times crossword editor Will Shortz.

In Revenge of the Nerds, Betty Childs and the other girls from her sorority sing a parody (though not the exact tune) to the Tri-Lambs.

Appears in the song “The Work Song” written by Kate McGarrigle on the 1982 album “Love Over and Over” by Kate & Anna McGarrigle. First recorded by Maria Muldaur on her 1973 album “Maria Muldaur”. Also covered by Margaret RoadKnight and Justin Vivian Bond.

References

External links
Aura Lea sheet music at the Lester S. Levy Collection of Sheet Music, Johns Hopkins University Libraries

American folk songs
Songs of the American Civil War
1861 in music
1861 establishments in the United States
1861 songs
Glen Campbell songs